The 1995 National Soccer League Grand Final was the championship match of the 1994–95 National Soccer League season and was played between Adelaide City and Melbourne Knights at Hindmarsh Stadium on 7 May 1995.

Road to the final

Adelaide City
Adelaide City entered the final series having finished second in the league to the Melbourne Knights. In the major semi-final, they won both legs with an aggregate score of 3–1, qualifying for the grand final ahead of the minor premiers.

Melbourne Knights
The Knights finished the NSL season as minor premiers. After losing the major semi-final to Adelaide City, the Knights followed up with a narrow 3–2 preliminary final victory over South Melbourne, who had finished sixth in the league.

Match

First half
Melbourne Knights opened the scoring with defender Andrew Marth scoring a goal from outside the penalty box after 36 minutes. Joe Spiteri followed up with a second five minutes later.

Second half
Brad Hassell had a shot hit the crossbar in the 76th minute which was Adelaide City's best chance.

Details

Post-match
The championship was the Knights' first win after having lost three grand finals since 1991.

Melbourne Knights defender Steve Horvat was awarded the Joe Marston Medal for best player in the grand final.

References

1995 in Australian soccer
NSL Grand Finals
Soccer in Adelaide
May 1995 sports events in Australia
1990s in Adelaide
Sports competitions in Adelaide
Melbourne Knights FC